Raymond Bouchard (born March 7, 1945 in Lauzon, Quebec) is a Canadian film, television and stage actor. He is most noted for his performances in the film Seducing Doctor Lewis (La Grande séduction), for which he received Genie Award and Prix Jutra nominations for Best Actor in 2004, and the television series L'Or et le Papier, for which he won the Prix Gémeaux for Best Actor in a Drama Series in 1990.

His other performances have included the television series Scoop, Virginie, Chartrand et Simonne and Trudeau (in which he played Jean Marchand), and the films Cordélia, Ding et Dong, La Florida, Nitro, Le Banquet, Life with My Father (La Vie avec mon père), Bluff, Funkytown and Death Dive (Le Scaphandrier).

References

External links

1945 births
Canadian male film actors
Canadian male television actors
Canadian male stage actors
Male actors from Quebec
French Quebecers
People from Lévis, Quebec
Living people